Þorsteinn is an Old Norse and Icelandic masculine given name. Notable people with the name include:

Þorsteinn Bachmann (born 1965), Icelandic actor
Þorsteinn Bjarnason (born 1957), Icelandic former professional footballer (goalkeeper)
Þorsteinn Eiríksson, the youngest son of Erik the Red
Þorsteinn Erlingsson (1858–1914), Icelandic poet
Þorsteinn frá Hamri (born 1938), Icelandic writer
Þorsteinn Gunnarsson (born 1940), Icelandic actor and architect
Þorsteinn Gylfason (1942–2005), Icelandic philosopher, translator, musician, poet, art enthusiast and intellectual
Þorsteinn J (full name Þorsteinn Jens Vilhjálmsson), an Icelandic television personality
Þorsteinn Pálsson (born 1947), Prime Minister of Iceland for the Independence Party from 1987 to 1988

Masculine given names
Icelandic masculine given names